Volume overload refers to the state of one of the chambers of the heart in which too large a volume of blood exists within it for it to function efficiently. Ventricular volume overload is approximately equivalent to an excessively high preload. It is a cause of cardiac failure.

Pathophysiology

In accordance with the Frank–Starling law of the heart, the myocardium contracts more powerfully as the end-diastolic volume increases. Stretching of the myofibrils in cardiac muscle causes them to contract more powerfully due to a greater number of cross-bridges being formed between the myofibrils within cardiac myocytes. This is true up to a point, however beyond this there is a loss of contractile ability due to loss of connection between myofibrils; see figure.

Various pathologies, listed below, can lead to volume overload. Different mechanisms are involved depending on the cause, however the common theme is that of a high cardiac output with a low or normal afterload. The output may be high due to the inefficiency in valve disease, or it may be high due to shunting of blood in left-to-right shunts and arteriovenous malformations.

Left ventricular volume overload may produce inverted u waves on the electrocardiogram.

Causes

Causes may be considered according to which chamber is affected.

Left ventricular volume overload
 Valvular heart disease
 Aortic regurgitation
 Mitral regurgitation, also causing left atrial volume overload
 Congenital heart defects
 Patent ductus arteriosus
 Ventricular septal defect, also causing left atrial volume overload
 Arteriovenous malformation and fistula
 Giant hepatic haemangioma
 High-output haemodialysis fistula
Right ventricular volume overload
 Valvular heart disease
 Tricuspid regurgitation
 Pulmonary regurgitation
 Congenital heart defects
 Atrial septal defect, also causing right atrial volume overload

See also
 Cardiac failure
 Frank–Starling law of the heart
 Preload (cardiology)
 Pressure overload

References

Cardiovascular physiology